The following Major League Baseball seasons are often known as the Year of the Pitcher:
 1968 Major League Baseball season
 2010 Major League Baseball season

Baseball terminology
1968 in baseball
2010 in baseball